Dronin is a Russian masculine surname, its feminine counterpart is Dronina. It may refer to
Jurgita Dronina (born 1986), Russian-Lithuanian ballet dancer
Roman Dronin (born 1983), Uzbekistani cyclist
Tatyana Dronina (born 1978), Russian handball player

See also
Bustin' + Dronin', a remix album by the band Blur

Russian-language surnames